Pádraig Ó Riain is an Irish Celticist and prominent hagiologist focusing on Irish hagiography, martyrdom, mythology, onomastics and codicology.

Ó Riain has spent much of his academic life at the University College Cork, where he became a lecturer in 1964. Between 1973 and his retirement, he was professor of Old and Middle Irish. He has been a member of the Royal Irish Academy since 1989, president of the Irish Texts Society since 1992, and more recently, a member of the Placenames Commission of Ireland (An Coimisiún Logainmneacha).  In the academic year 2000-01, he was Parnell Fellow at Magdalene College, Cambridge.

Selected works 
 Clár na Lámhscríbhinní Gaeilge sa Bhreatain Bhig. Dublin, 1968.
 Corpus Genealogiarum Sanctorum Hiberniae. Dublin, 1985. .
 Beatha Bharra, Saint Finbarr of Cork: The Complete Life. Irish Texts Society 57. London. 1993. .
 The Making of a Saint: Finbarr of Cork 600-1200. Irish Texts Society Subsidiary Series 5. London, 1997. .
 (ed.) Irish Texts Society: The First Hundred Years. Irish Texts Society Subsidiary Series 9. London, 1998. .
 (ed. with John Carey and Máire Herbert). Saints and Scholars: Studies in Irish Hagiography. Dublin, 2001. .
 Four Irish Martyrologies: Drummond, Turin, Cashel, York. Woodbridge, 2002. .
 (ed.) Beatha Aodha Ruaidh, the Life of Red Hugh O’Donnell: Historical and Literary Contexts. Irish Texts Society Subsidiary Series 12. London, 2002. 
 (ed. with Diarmuid Ó Murchadha and Kevin Murray). Historical Dictionary of Gaelic Placenames: Foclóir Stairiúil Áitainmneacha na Gaeilge, Fascicle 1, Names Beginning in A-. London, 2002. .

Festschrift 
 John Carey, Máire Herbert and Kevin Murray (eds.), Cín Chille Cúile: Texts, Saints and Places. Essays in Honour of Pádraig Ó Riain. Celtic Studies Publications. Aberystwyth, 2004. .

References

Celtic studies scholars
Linguists from the Republic of Ireland
Living people
20th-century Irish writers
21st-century Irish writers
Irish-language writers
Year of birth missing (living people)
Academics of University College Cork
Codicologists
Members of the Royal Irish Academy